Utility pigeons are domesticated pigeons bred to be a source of meat called squab. Squabs have been used as a food in many nations for centuries. They were bred to breed and grow quickly. Because they are bred for squab production, conformation to a show standard is usually deemed unimportant.

Utility pigeons are one of three main breed groupings used by pigeon fanciers. The other two are Flying/Sporting and Fancy.

The characteristics of utility pigeons of most importance to the businessperson who is keeping them are rapid growth and high fecundity.

There are breeds of pigeons which at one time were raised for utility purposes but which are now raised for show purposes.  Fanciers usually distinguish between the two sub-breeds by appending the word "show" or "utility" to the name of the breed.  For example, there are show King pigeons and Utility Kings and they are two different breeds of pigeon. The show breeds can still be used for squabbing purposes.

See also

 American Giant Runt
 Carneau
 French Mondain
 King pigeon
 Strasser pigeon
 List of pigeon breeds

References 

Pigeon breeds
Domestic pigeons